The North East Breeze was a newspaper founded in 1868 and serving North East, Pennsylvania and its environs. According to the 1984 header, the paper covered "North East, Greenfield, Ripley, Wattsburg, Venango, Findley Lake, and Harborcreek."

Previous names
 1868: The North East Herald
 1868–1873: The North East Star
 1873–1928: The North East Sun

References

Defunct newspapers published in Pennsylvania
Publications established in 1868
1868 establishments in Pennsylvania
Publications with year of disestablishment missing